Defa'-e Moqaddas (Soffeh) Metro Station is a station on Isfahan Metro Line 1. The station opened on 18 March 2018. It is located along Dastgerdi Expressway (Isfahan - Shiraz) south of Defa'-e Moqaddas interchange, the station's namesake. The station is Line 1's southern terminus right now. The next station on the north side is Kuy-e Emam Station . The station is located north of Soffeh Terminal, thus connecting to buses connecting Isfahan to towns in the province and cities farther away such as Shiraz and Bandarabbas.

References

Isfahan Metro stations
Railway stations opened in 2017